Frederick William Steep (20 December 1874 – 14 September 1956) was a Canadian amateur soccer player who competed in the 1904 Summer Olympics. Steep was born in St. Catharines, Ontario. In 1904 he was a member of the Galt F.C. team, which won the gold medal in the soccer tournament. He played all two matches as a forward and scored one goal in a 7-0 win over the United States, represented by Christian Brothers College.

References

External links
profile

1874 births
1956 deaths
Canadian soccer players
Association football forwards
Footballers at the 1904 Summer Olympics
Olympic gold medalists for Canada
Olympic soccer players of Canada
Soccer people from Ontario
Sportspeople from St. Catharines
Olympic medalists in football
Medalists at the 1904 Summer Olympics